Tartarugalzinho is a municipality located in the east of the state of Amapá in Brazil. It was established as a municipality on 17 December 1987.

Overview 
The first settlement in the municipality was located on the Tartarugal Grande River, however the rapids made transport difficult, and the town was moved to a tributary. That town has become known as Tartarugalzinho.

The economy is based on raising livestock, primarily cattle and buffalo, subsistence farming and fishing. The discovery of gold in the area has caused a population surge. A major industry in the municipality is the Champion factory which turns eucalyptus seeds into pulp for the paper industry. 

Bom Jesus dos Fernandes, an agricultural village, is located within the municipality.

Nature 
The municipality contains part of the  Lago Piratuba Biological Reserve, a fully protected conservation unit created in 1980.
It also contains 7.64% of the  Amapá State Forest, a sustainable use conservation unit established in 2006.

References

External links 
 Official website (in Portuguese)
 

Municipalities in Amapá
Populated places in Amapá